Delta Force 2: The Colombian Connection is a 1990 American action film, and a sequel to the 1986 Chuck Norris film The Delta Force, also starring Norris as Major Scott McCoy. It is the second installment in The Delta Force film series. In this film, McCoy, now a colonel, leads his Delta team into the fictional South American country of San Carlos to rescue hostages and stop the flow of cocaine into the United States.

Delta Force 2: The Colombian Connection was disliked by critics for sparse connections to its predecessor, a clichéd script, subpar acting, and similarities to the earlier Norris vehicle Missing in Action.

Plot
Ramon Cota (Billy Drago) is a wealthy and powerful drug kingpin who controls the cocaine industry with an iron fist. His drugs pour steadily into America, corrupting the country's youth and causing a feud between the DEA and San Carlos, Cota's country of origin.

The film opens during a carnival in Rio de Janeiro, as an undercover task force led by several DEA agents conducts surveillance on a private party that Cota is attending (similar to a Mardi Gras ball); however, the surveillance team is ambushed and massacred by Cota's hitmen, who are masquerading as carnival performers. Due to the Rio fiasco, the DEA enlists the support of the U.S. Army's Delta Force in order to infiltrate San Carlos. They are aided by an undercover agent within Cota's drug cartel.

General Taylor orders Colonel Scott McCoy (Chuck Norris) and his deputy, Major Bobby Chavez (Paul Perri) to bring Cota to court. They pose as airline passengers while Cota is en route to Geneva to deposit his drug money in a Swiss bank account, and are able to capture him during a short interval in which the plane enters U.S. airspace. However, their efforts amount to nothing as Cota is easily able to post bail and escape. Unable to contain his rage, Chavez furiously lashes out at Cota in court. Cota decides to strike at Chavez by having Chavez's pregnant wife killed.
 
Out on a personal mission of vengeance, Chavez is captured by Cota's forces and is tortured and killed. When three DEA agents attempt to go in and bring Cota and his army down, they are taken hostage, and are to be executed. During a press conference, a spokesman for the DEA explains that San Carlos's president Alcazar fears a coup and is therefore reluctant to crack down on the cartels, while his corrupt generals benefit from the drug trade and are willing to protect Cota from extradition.

McCoy is parachuted into San Carlos and sent to rescue the hostages in a stealth operation, while Taylor and the rest of the Delta Force perform surveillance. Their mission is supervised by a delegate from the government of San Carlos, which has entered an agreement with the U.S. government that severely limits the scope of the mission. Meanwhile, McCoy scales a tall cliff and infiltrates Cota's mansion.

Later, the government of San Carlos attempts to cancel the U.S. intervention outright by staging a massive drug raid that would make the American mission unnecessary. Upon learning of the hoax, Taylor breaks protocol and heads south of his perimeter in a heavily armed gunship, prompting the San Carlos army to send their own choppers in pursuit. The chopper lands at Cota's mansion and deploys troops to destroy cocaine storehouses and laboratories. McCoy succeeds in releasing the hostages, but is captured by Cota and placed in a chamber filled with toxic gas and isolated by a glass pane. Before the gas can kill him, however, a rocket from Taylor's gunship shatters the glass, allowing him to break through.

With the help of DEA Agent Page, McCoy captures Cota in his own armored limousine and flees the mansion. Cota's bodyguards and a San Carlos attack helicopter pursue the vehicle and eventually bring it to a halt, but Taylor's gunship saves them. Cota flees on foot through the jungle during the fighting. After the drug lord kills a villager who wanted revenge for the murder of her family, McCoy arrives and beats him. Cota then tries to goad McCoy into killing him, knowing he is wanted alive.

Taylor's helicopter arrives to pick up McCoy and his prisoner with ropes, as the last few of Cota's men close in. One of them swings his machete but only manages to partially cut Cota's rope before the helicopter heads out to sea to join the American carrier fleet. Hanging beneath the chopper, Cota continues to goad McCoy about his invulnerability, saying that once in court he will walk free again. However, the rope grows thinner from the machete cut, until it snaps completely. The film ends with Cota falling thousands of feet to his death.

Cast

 Chuck Norris as Colonel Scott McCoy
 Billy Drago as Ramon Cota
 John P. Ryan as General Taylor
 Richard Jaeckel as DEA Agent John Page
 Paul Perri as Major Bobby Chavez
 Begoña Plaza as Quiquina Esquilinta
 Héctor Mercado as Miguel
 Mark Margolis as General Olmedo
 Kelly Wicker as a Judge
 Rick Prieto as Carlos

Production

Development
The film was originally known as Stranglehold.

"They're rewriting the script", said Norris in December 1988. "It's better to straighten out the problems in the screenplay now, rather than later. I hate it when you start a movie with a script half done; chances are you'll end up with a mediocre movie. The first `Delta Force' was well written."

"I researched drug kingpins during the three years we worked to prepare for this movie", added Norris, "and much of what I read convinced me that you're dealing with unconscionable, truly vicious individuals. It's true, there are some changes in Colombia, but the fighting is still going on, and these people are other places as well. And what you're fighting is billions of dollars. That much money means an enormous amount of power. That's why we portrayed our kingpin that vindictively. It happens. They feel they're above the law, and when you get in their way, they don't just go after you. They kill your wife, aunts, uncles, all relatives. They eliminate your lineage."
 
Jean-Claude Van Damme was offered a role in the film but he turned it down to do Cyborg.

Billy Drago was cast as the villain. "It is, in a sense, a straight-ahead action picture and you're talking about Good vs. Evil", said Drago, "and it is pretty black and white. . . . It's not a matter of becoming someone else as it is really more a matter of finding that dark part of myself that everybody has someplace. I also approach it from an amoral point of view rather than immoral. He was not some cokehead going nuts. And in a sense, that made him scarier. . . . They turn up in Forbes magazine when they list the world's richest men. I'm not one to do a whole lot of research and approach it that way, but I did already know about Pablo Escobar and the character is based on him, very loosely."

Filming
Filming started in March 1989 under the title Stranglehold: Delta Force 2. Although the film is set principally in South America, most of the scenes set in the fictional South American country of San Carlos and rural Colombia were shot in Tagaytay, Philippines. This explains the visibility of the Taal Volcano in some scenes.

Much of the film was shot at an unfinished hilltop mansion in the mountain resort of Tagaytay called the People's Park in the Sky that Imelda Marcos started building in 1983 as a guest house for a visit, never made, by then-U.S. President Ronald Reagan. "It had never been used", Norris says. "When Marcos was booted out, it was just left, an empty shell. We bought it, made $1 million worth of refurbishments, since it wasn't in good shape, and even built a swimming pool. And then we blew it up."

The opening parade during the Brasilian Carnaval was filmed outside the Palacio del Gobernador in Intramuros, Manila (doubling for Rio de Janeiro).

Helicopter crash
On May 16, 1989 the unit had been filming for two months and was due to be finished on May 27. A helicopter took off to film a scene, then veered to the left and plunged into a 40-foot ravine. Four people on board were killed – electricians Don Marshall and Mike Graham and cameraman Gaddi Dansig, along with pilot, Jojo Imperial. About 10 people were hospitalized, including actor John P. Ryan and stuntman/actor Matthew Gomez. Days later the actor Geoff Brewer died. Norris stated that production shut down for six weeks, in order for everyone to recuperate and added that the casualties were his close friends. He also stated that production in the Philippines could have continued but the cast and crew were "so devastated" and had to return to the United States to "get our minds functioning again."

After the accident, the production looked at alternative locations, including Puerto Rico. They transferred to Tennessee to complete filming. The movie is dedicated to the memory of the crew killed.

This was the second helicopter accident in a Norris film. The first happened during the filming of Braddock: Missing in Action III in the Philippines, when four soldiers working as extras were killed in the crash of the military helicopter the film company was renting.

The families of the men killed later sued Cannon films.

Release

Theatrical
Delta Force 2 was released in the United States on August 24, 1990. In the Philippines, the film was released with the same name by Solar Films on November 29, 1990.

Marketing
MGM spent $5 million on TV advertisements.

Reception

Box office
Delta Force 2: The Colombian Connection made $1.85 million in its first week, ranking 6th overall.

Critical response
The critical reaction was negative. The movie was criticized for having little in common with its predecessor, a poor script, clichés, subpar acting, and similarities to the earlier Norris vehicle Missing in Action.

On Rotten Tomatoes the film has an approval rating of 11% based on reviews from 9 critics.

Sequel

The film was followed by Delta Force 3: The Killing Game starring Mike Norris. Chuck Norris did not appear in the film.

See also

Chuck Norris filmography
List of American films of 1990

References

External links

 

1990 films
1990 action films
American action films
American films about revenge
American sequel films
Films about cocaine
Films about Colombian drug cartels
Films about Delta Force
Films directed by Aaron Norris
Films set in a fictional country
Films set in Rio de Janeiro (city)
Films shot in the Philippines
Golan-Globus films
Metro-Goldwyn-Mayer films
Films produced by Yoram Globus
1990s English-language films
1990s American films